The USDA’s Economic Research Service (ERS) has developed a farm typology, or farm classification, that divides the 2.1 million U.S. farms into 8 mutually exclusive and relatively homogeneous groups:
limited resource farms
retirement farms
residential/lifestyle farms
farming occupation/lower sales
farming occupation/high sales
large family farms
very large family farms
nonfamily farms.

Also, the eight categories can be collapsed into 3:
rural residence farms
intermediate farms
commercial farms

Data for 2003 indicate that Commercial farms, those having sales of $250,000 or more annually, constitute 9% of all farms and account for 72% of production. Intermediate farms, constituting 24% of all farms, account for 19% of production. The largest number of farms, characterized as rural residence farms, constitute 68% of all farms and account for 8% of production.

See also

Small farm

References

External links
Updating the ERS Farm Typology U.S. Department of Agriculture, Economic Research Service

United States Department of Agriculture